Talel Chedly (born 21 April 1978) is a French football striker. As of May 2018, he works for Odier Excursions, a bus company based in Geneva, Switzerland.

See also
Football in Switzerland
List of football clubs in Switzerland

References

External links

1978 births
Living people
French footballers
Servette FC players
Association football forwards